Ropica honesta is a species of beetle in the family Cerambycidae. It was described by Pascoe in 1865. It is known from Borneo, Sumatra, Java, New Guinea, the Philippines, and China.

References

honesta
Beetles described in 1865